Eustathes semiusta is a species of beetle in the family Cerambycidae. It was described by Pascoe in 1867. It is known from the Moluccas.

References

Astathini
Beetles described in 1867